The Secretary of State for Children, Schools and Families was a secretary of state in the Government of the United Kingdom, responsible for the work of the Department for Children, Schools and Families.

The post was created on 28 June 2007 after the disbanding of the Department for Education and Skills by Gordon Brown.  The only Secretary of State with this title was Ed Balls, a former treasury aide to Brown. He was responsible for coordinating work across Government relevant to youth justice, the respect agenda and family policy, while also taking over responsibility for education policy up to the age of 19 in England from the Department for Education and Skills, with the Secretary of State for Innovation, Universities and Skills being responsible for education after that age. Other responsibilities included inputs into the Government's strategy for ending child poverty, with the Department for Work and Pensions and into promoting the health of all children by working with the Department of Culture, Media and Sport.

The corresponding shadow minister was the Shadow Secretary of State for Children, Schools and Families, and the Secretary of State was also scrutinised by the Children, Schools and Families Select Committee.

On 12 May 2010, the Department was again renamed and Michael Gove was appointed Secretary of State for Education.

Secretary of State

Colour key (for political parties):

References

Education in England
United Kingdom
Defunct ministerial offices in the United Kingdom
2007 establishments in the United Kingdom
2010 disestablishments in the United Kingdom
Education ministers of the United Kingdom